This article lists events from the year 2019 in Montenegro.

Incumbents
 President: Milo Đukanović 
 Prime Minister: Duško Marković

Events

2 February to 30 September – 2019 Montenegrin anti-corruption protests 
24 December 2019 to present – 2019–2020 Clerical protests in Montenegro

Deaths

3 March – Uroš Tošković, painter (b. 1932).

30 June – Momir Bulatović, politician, President of the Republic of Montenegro and Prime Minister of the Federal Republic of Yugoslavia (b. 1956).

1 August – Milovan Minja Prelević, footballer (b. 1970).

19 September – Koča Pavlović, journalist and politician (b. 1962).

13 October – Goran Marković, footballer (b. 1986).

25 October – Janko Vučinić, boxer and politician (b. 1966).

20 December – Marko Orlandić, politician, Prime Minister and President (b. 1930).

References

Links

 
2010s in Montenegro
Years of the 21st century in Montenegro
Montenegro
Montenegro